Matea Parlov Koštro (born 2 June 1992) is a Croatian long-distance runner. She competed in the women's marathon at the 2019 World Athletics Championships held in Doha, Qatar. She did not finish her race. She finished 21st in the women's marathon at the 2020 Summer Olympics held in Tokyo, Japan.

References

External links 
 

Living people
1992 births
Place of birth missing (living people)
Croatian female long-distance runners
World Athletics Championships athletes for Croatia
Athletes (track and field) at the 2020 Summer Olympics
Olympic athletes of Croatia
European Athletics Championships medalists
Competitors at the 2015 Summer Universiade 
Competitors at the 2017 Summer Universiade
20th-century Croatian women
21st-century Croatian women